Kostas Smoriginas (born April 22, 1953) is a Lithuanian theatre and cinema actor and musician.

Since the 2000s he performs solo.

Filmography
Since 1976 he played in over 40 films, including:
Loss (2008)
Nikolai Vavilov (1990), starring Nikolai Vavilov, a persecuted prominent Soviet biologist

Discography
Aktorių trio
„Mūsų kaime“
„Tikras garsas“
„Vėl kartu“
Self
„Pilietis“
„Ponai ir Ponios“

Awards
2008: Best Actor award at Sidabrinė gervė 2008 Lithuanina film industry awards
2001: Lithuanian National Prize.
1987: USSR State Prize

References

1953 births
Living people
20th-century Lithuanian male actors
Lithuanian musicians
Recipients of the Lithuanian National Prize
Lithuanian male film actors
Lithuanian people of Russian descent
Recipients of the USSR State Prize